Jose Laurel Street, historically known as Calle conde de Avilés, is a tree-lined street in the district of San Miguel in north-central Manila, Philippines. It runs parallel to the Pasig River from the Nagtahan Interchange south-westwards to Ayala Bridge. It is where Malacañang Palace and several other government buildings are located. 

The street has had several different names throughout the years, including Calzada de San Miguel, Calle de Malacañang (west of Estero de Aviles or present-day San Rafael Street), and Calle de Uliuli (east of Estero de Aviles), but by the 1870s, it was known as Calle conde de Avilés. It was named after Don José Vicente de Áviles, el Conde de Avilés, who financed the extension of the street to the Rotonda de Sampaloc, which is now the Nagtahan Interchange. A small plaza across Malacañang Palace was also named after Áviles. It was also one of the right-of-way alignments of the tranvía that existed until 1945. In 1959, the street was renamed to its present name in honor of a former resident of the palace and president, José Paciano Laurel.

Other notable buildings along the street include Casa Roces, College of the Holy Spirit, the National Shrine of Saint Jude, the National Shrine of Saint Michael and the Archangels and the Philippine Commission on Women. Public access to Laurel Street is generally restricted for security reasons. The nearest LRT Line 2 station is Legarda station.

Gallery

See also
 Mendiola Street
 List of eponymous streets in Manila

References

Streets in Manila
San Miguel, Manila